Miray Naz Daner (born 15 January 1999) is a Turkish actress. She played "Hilal" in Vatanım Sensin, a series about the Turkish War of Independence. She won a Golden Butterfly Award for her role in the series.

Life and career
Daner began her career at the age of seven as child actor. In 2013, she studied in English Preparatory Class of Cemal Reşit Rey Fine Arts High School for one year. She studied cello, piano, and singing in the Music Department of Cemal Reşit Rey Fine Arts High School and studied her final year in the Music Department of Mimar Sinan Fine Arts High School but she left the fine arts high school due to absences and is going to finish her education by distance education. Among her paternal relatives are actors Aras Bulut İynemli (cousin), Orçun İynemli (cousin), Cengiz Daner (uncle), and İlhan Daner (great uncle). She has an older sister, fashion designer İpek Nur Daner. Her maternal grandfather is one of the Turks who immigrated from Greece to Turkey due to war.

Beginning at the age of nine, she played in 121 episodes in Papatyam as "Gonca", opposite Metin Akpınar who is cited as one of the best actors in Turkish cinema. She portrayed Sabiha Gökçen, the world's first female fighter pilot, Turkish pilot and foster child of Mustafa Kemal Atatürk in her first movie Dersimiz Atatürk with Halit Ergenç, and later played in the film Çınar Ağacı among a starred ensemble cast. Her other roles include "Doll Nergis" (her first role) in an episode of popular fantastic series Bez Bebek, and "Young Zeynep" in an episode of hit comedy series 1 Kadın 1 Erkek. She also played in theatre "Sürç-i Lisan Etti-isek Affola" and commercials.

At the age of thirteen, she played her first lead role in Zil Çalınca, the first Turkish series of Disney Channel and an adaptation of As The Bell Rings. She appeared as herself in the short movie Zil Çalınca Avı. She played opposite Cihan Şimşek for the fifth time in Merhaba Hayat, an adaptation of Private Practice and Medcezir, an adaptation of The O.C. series. She also had a role in the film Arkadaşım Max, starring a dog named Max. Since childhood, she has played characters in various genres including comedy, fantastic, biography, and drama. 

At the age of seventeen, she played "Hilal" in Vatanım Sensin, a series about the Turkish War of Independence. She won a Golden Butterfly Award for her role in the series. Daner had the leading role in series Liter tears as Cihan and leading role in Saygı: Bir Ercüment Çözer Dizisi as Helen. She starred in the movie Hürkuş, based on the life of aviator Vecihi Hürkuş.

Miray Daner has been involved in a romantic relationship with former player of The Turkey national under-18 football team, Oğulcan Engin, who is the son of famous singer Seda Sayan and football player Sinan Engin.

Theatre

Filmography

Film

Television

Music videos
Bergüzar Korel - "Son Mektup"

Awards

References

1999 births
Living people
Turkish film actresses
Turkish television actresses
Turkish child actresses
21st-century Turkish actresses
Actresses from Istanbul
Golden Butterfly Award winners